Bibisara Assaubayeva (Kazakh: Бибісара Асаубаева, Bibısara Asaubaeva; born 26 February 2004) is a Kazakh chess player. Assaubayeva holds the titles of International Master and Woman Grandmaster. She is the reigning two-time Women's World Blitz Chess Champion. She is the first Muslim woman in history to make this achievement. She was given the award of Outstanding Female Chess Player of 2021 in Asia by FIDE. She entered the Guinness World Records book in 2022, for her achievement as the youngest women's World Blitz Chess Champion, which she became in 2021 and retained in 2022.

Biography
Born in Taraz, Kazakhstan, Assaubayeva played her first chess game at the age of four, taught by her grandfather. She won her first city championship when she was six years old. She achieved the title of Woman FIDE Master in 2011, at the age of 7, when she won the World Youth Championships in Caldas Novas, Brazil in the Girls U8 section. Assaubayeva also competed in artistic gymnastics being a champion of Astana several times.

In 2016 she moved with her family to live in Moscow and switched her federation affiliation to Russia. Assaubayeva won the gold medal at the World Cadets Championships in Batumi, Georgia in the Girls U12 category, and the next year, she won silver in the Girls U14 division in Montevideo, Uruguay. Also in 2017, at the age of 13, Assaubayeva competed in the European Individual Championship in Minsk. She won three games, lost three and drew four, gaining a norm for the title of International Master.

In 2019 Assaubayeva decided to move back to Kazakhstan and switched her national federation to her native country; she never applied for the Russian citizenship while living in Russia. In March 2019 she made her debut in the Kazakhstani national team at the Women's World Team Championship on the 3rd and 2nd boards and gained 5 points out of 9; the result was the best in the team.

In December 2021, she finished second behind Alexandra Kosteniuk in the Women's World Rapid Championship, held in Warsaw, Poland. 2 days later she became the Women's World Blitz champion, winning the event held with a round to spare and a score of 14/17, winning 13 games. She defended her title the next year, at the World Blitz Chess Championship 2022 held in Almaty, Kazakhstan, where she won with a score of 13/17.

Controversies
Russian grandmaster and coach Evgeniy Solozhenkin accused Assaubayeva on several internet articles of cheating during the World Youth U14 Championship in Uruguay in September 2017. The FIDE Ethics Commission suspended Solozhenkin for making unsubstantiated allegations of cheating. A group of grandmasters wrote an open letter in support of Solozhenkin. Assaubayeva's family sued Solozhenkin for defamatory allegations made in public and in the media that offended Assaubayeva's honor and dignity. The Moscow Appellate Court ordered Solozhenkin to apologize, disavow his allegations to the media, delete the defamatory articles, and pay a compensatory sum of 100 thousand rubles.

In 2022 the investigative journalism outlet Meduza revealed that she, along with many other female chess players have received harassments in form of unsolicited letters containing used condoms and pornographic pictures from a resident in Riga, Latvia. With the assistance of forensic experts and through searching the contents of data breaches, Meduza managed to pinpoint the identity of the sender to international master Andrejs Strebkovs.

Achievements
 December 2022 - Women's World Blitz Chess Championship - winner
 December 2021 - Women's World Blitz Chess Championship - winner (with one round to spare)
 December 2021 - Women's World Rapid Chess Championship - 2nd Place
 August 2021 -  Asian Women's Continental Online Chess Championship - winner
 August 2019 - 26th Abu Dhabi International Chess Festival, Open, 3rd place among Women
May 2019 - Tashkent Zonal 3.4 tournament Women - 1-3 place, 3rd on tiebreak
February 2019 - Moscow Open Women - third place
June 2017 – FIDE Master, European Individual Chess Championship 2017, Minsk
October 2016 - winner, U12, World Championship among cadets in classical chess, Batumi, Georgia.
September 2014 – vice world champion, girls U10, Durban, South Africa
August 2014 – winner in U-2000 category of 21st Abu Dhabi International Chess Festival
August 2014 – winner at 10 years old, male U14, in 13th Dubai Juniors Chess Championship
June 2014 – vice Asian champion, girls U12, Tashkent, Uzbekistan
May 2013 – world champion, girls U9, Porto Caras, Greece
May 2012 – world champion, girls U9, Iasi, Romania
March 2012 – champion of Kazakhstan in blitz chess, girls U12 (when she was 8 years old)
at the age of seven she was awarded the title of Woman FIDE Master of the World Chess Federation
November 2011 – gold medal, junior world champion, U8, Caldas Novas, Brazil
May 2011 – world champion among schoolchildren, girls U7, Krakow, Poland

References

External links
 
 Telegram channel

2004 births
Living people
Kazakhstani female chess players
Russian female chess players
Chess woman grandmasters
Chess International Masters
World Youth Chess Champions
People from Taraz
21st-century Kazakhstani women